Saltik or Saltık may refer to:

People

 Hasan Saltık, Turkish record producer, owner of Kalan Müzik
 Sari Saltik (Sarı Saltuk), Muslim Bektashi saint linked in Bulgaria to Kaliakra

Places

 Saltık, Tokat Province, a town in Turkey
 Saltık, Sandıklı district, Afyonkarahisar Province, a town in Turkey

Turkish-language surnames